Tyler Duguid (born October 17, 2000), is a Canadian rugby union player. His usual playing position is in the second row as a Lock. He currently plays for Montpellier in the French Top 14.

Career

Club
Duguid spent the 2019–2020 season with the RC Narbonne espoirs program.

Duguid signed a two-year academy deal with Montpellier in June 2020. March 24, 2019 Canadian Junior Greco Roman Wrestling Champion at 120kg  https://wrestling.ca/thoms-and-duguid-named-outstanding-greco-roman-wrestlers/

Club statistics

Honours
 European Rugby Challenge Cup
 Champion: 2021

References

2000 births
Living people
Canada international rugby union players
Canadian expatriate rugby union players
Rugby union locks